The following is a list of the 97 municipalities (comuni) of the Metropolitan City of Reggio Calabria, Calabria, Italy.

List

See also
List of municipalities of Italy

References

Reggio Calabria